Meathouse is a term for an outbuilding which preserves meat cured with salt, while if meat is cured by smoke would be called a smokehouse.

It may also refer to:

 Meathouse, Kentucky, an unincorporated community in the United States
 Meathouse Fork, a river in West Virginia, United States
 Meat market, a marketplace where meat is sold
 Butcher shop, a specialized store preparing meat for sale

See also
 Meat market (disambiguation)
 Meat (disambiguation)